Vladimir Viktorovich Zhigily (December 16, 1952 ) is a retired Soviet basketball player who competed for the Soviet Union in the 1976 Summer Olympics and the 1980 Summer Olympics and won bronze medals.

References

1952 births
Soviet men's basketball players
1974 FIBA World Championship players
1978 FIBA World Championship players
Olympic basketball players of the Soviet Union
Basketball players at the 1976 Summer Olympics
Basketball players at the 1980 Summer Olympics
Olympic bronze medalists for the Soviet Union
Olympic medalists in basketball
BC Dynamo Moscow players
Living people

Medalists at the 1980 Summer Olympics
Medalists at the 1976 Summer Olympics
FIBA World Championship-winning players